The Royal College of Dentists of Canada (RCDC) is a regulatory college which administers examinations for qualified dental specialists as part of the dentistry profession in Canada. Its headquarters are in Toronto.

The RCDC was established federally in 1965 to promote high standards of specialization in the dental profession and to recognize properly trained dental specialists. The current examinations are known as the National Dental Specialty Examination (NDSE). Successful completion may lead to Fellowship in the College (FRCDC).

See also

List of Canadian organizations with royal patronage
National Dental Examining Board of Canada (NDEB)

References

External links
Royal College of Dentists of Canada

Dental organizations based in Canada
1965 establishments in Ontario
Royal colleges
Organizations established in 1965
Dentists